Attorney General Clerides may refer to:

Costas Clerides (born 1952), Attorney General of Cyprus
Petros Clerides (born 1946), Attorney General of Cyprus